Israel Rosh (born March 3, 1988) is an Israeli footballer playing for Hapoel Ra'anana.

He is of a Tunisian-Jewish descent.

References

1988 births
Living people
Israeli footballers
Hakoah Maccabi Amidar Ramat Gan F.C. players
F.C. Ashdod players
Hapoel Ramat Gan F.C. players
Hapoel Tel Aviv F.C. players
Ironi Tiberias F.C. players
Hapoel Ra'anana A.F.C. players
Liga Leumit players
Israeli Premier League players
Footballers from Ashdod
Israeli people of Tunisian-Jewish descent
Association football defenders